Now Shahr (also known as Now Shār and Nushar) is a village in Fuladlui Shomali Rural District, Hir District, Ardabil County, Ardabil Province, Iran. At the 2006 census, its population was 1,704, in 352 families.

References 

Towns and villages in Ardabil County